The following elections occurred in the year 1860.  Most notably, the 1860 United States presidential election was one of the events that precipitated the American Civil War.

North America

United States
 California's at-large congressional district
 1860 New York state election
 1860 and 1861 United States House of Representatives elections
 1860 United States presidential election
 1860 and 1861 United States Senate elections
 1860 Vermont elections

Europe

Malta 

 1860 Maltese general election

Netherlands 
 1860 Dutch general election

Switzerland 
 1860 Swiss federal election

South America

Argentina 
 1860 Argentine presidential election

Oceania

New Zealand 

 1860–1861 New Zealand general election

See also
 :Category:1860 elections

1860
Elections